Korać is a surname. Notable persons with that name include:

 Dušan Korać (disambiguation), multiple people
 Milorad Korać (born 1969), Serbian football player and manager
 Radivoj Korać (1938–1969), Serbian basketball player
 Vitomir Korać (1877–1941), Croatian Serb politician
 Vojislav Korać (1924–2010), Serbian historian
 Žarko Korać (born 1947), Serbian psychologist and politician
 Žarko Korać (footballer) (born 1987), Montenegrin football player

Serbian surnames